Browns Bay is one of the most northernmost suburbs in the contiguous Auckland metropolitan area, located in the North Shore. It is located in the East Coast Bays area, a string of small suburbs that form the northernmost part of the North Shore of Auckland.

Browns Bay is under the local governance of the Auckland Council, and is located in the Albany ward, one of thirteen administrative areas in the council.

The population was estimated to be  as of

History
Peter Brown, after whom the bay is named, bought  of bush and scrub there in 1876. He built his house on what is now the corner of Clyde Road and Anzac Road. This house was destroyed by fire in 1930. He also built a manager's residence in 1886 overlooking his land (now Freyberg Park) at 33 Glencoe Road. This house still exists and is believed to be the oldest existing house in East Coast Bays.

Demographics

Browns Bay had a population of 9,996 at the 2018 New Zealand census, an increase of 567 people (6.0%) since the 2013 census, and an increase of 1,206 people (13.7%) since the 2006 census. There were 3,417 households, comprising 4,923 males and 5,073 females, giving a sex ratio of 0.97 males per female, with 1,818 people (18.2%) aged under 15 years, 1,986 (19.9%) aged 15 to 29, 4,806 (48.1%) aged 30 to 64, and 1,386 (13.9%) aged 65 or older.

Ethnicities were 68.6% European/Pākehā, 4.9% Māori, 1.8% Pacific peoples, 27.6% Asian, and 3.8% other ethnicities. People may identify with more than one ethnicity.

The percentage of people born overseas was 52.7, compared with 27.1% nationally.

Although some people chose not to answer the census's question about religious affiliation, 53.9% had no religion, 34.8% were Christian, 0.1% had Māori religious beliefs, 0.8% were Hindu, 0.8% were Muslim, 1.6% were Buddhist and 1.7% had other religions.

Of those at least 15 years old, 2,556 (31.3%) people had a bachelor's or higher degree, and 744 (9.1%) people had no formal qualifications. 1,875 people (22.9%) earned over $70,000 compared to 17.2% nationally. The employment status of those at least 15 was that 4,209 (51.5%) people were employed full-time, 1,224 (15.0%) were part-time, and 321 (3.9%) were unemployed.

Education
The school was established in 1888.

The Corelli International Academic School of the Arts was a private composite (years 1-13) school which ran specialist programs in visual arts, music, drama and dance as well as the general curriculum. It went into receivership in 2016.

Sport and recreation
The East Coast Bays Barracudas rugby league club is based in Browns Bay.

Notes
The Browns Bay Magazine is run by the local business association.

External links
 http://www.brownsbay.org.nz Official Browns Bay Website
 Google Maps: Browns Bay (satellite photograph)
 Photographs of Browns Bay held in Auckland Libraries' heritage collections.

Suburbs of Auckland
Beaches of the Auckland Region
Bays of the Auckland Region
East Coast Bays